The 2015/16 FIS Ski Jumping Alpen Cup was the 26th Alpen Cup season in ski jumping for men and the 8th for ladies.

Other competitive circuits this season included the World Cup, Grand Prix, Continental Cup, FIS Cup and FIS Race.

Calendar

Men

Ladies

Men's team

Overall standings

Men

Ladies

References

2015 in ski jumping
2016 in ski jumping
FIS Ski Jumping Alpen Cup